Corbu may refer to:
 Le Corbusier, an architect
 Corbu, Dondușeni, a commune in Dondușeni district, Moldova

Populated places in Romania:
 Corbu, Constanța, a commune in Constanța County
 Corbu, Harghita, a commune in Harghita County
 Corbu, Olt, a commune in Olt County
 Corbu, a village in Cătina Commune, Buzău County
 Corbu, a village in Glodeanu-Siliștea Commune, Buzău County
 Corbu, a village in Teslui Commune, Olt County
 Corbu, a village in Lipovăț Commune, Vaslui County
 Corbu, a district in Brezoi Town, Vâlcea County
 Corbu Nou and Corbu Vechi, villages in Măxineni Commune, Brăila County

Rivers in Romania:
 Corbu (Bistricioara), a tributary of the Bistricioara (Siret basin) in Harghita County
 Corbu, a tributary of the Boia Mică in Vâlcea County
 Corbu, a tributary of the Crevedia in Hunedoara County
 Corbu, a tributary of the Sebeș in Brașov County

People:
 Carol Corbu
 Haralambie Corbu
 Laurențiu Corbu
 Liliana Corbu

See also 
 Corb (disambiguation)
 Corban (disambiguation)
 Corbești (disambiguation)
 Corbeni (disambiguation)
 Corbi, name of two villages in Romania
 Corbeanca, name of two villages in Romania

Romanian-language surnames